Tom Mutch (born June 16, 1967) is an American former ice hockey coach of the Boston College women's ice hockey team.

Playing career
Mutch played his college career with the Northeastern University Huskies from 1986 to 1988. Afterwards, he played professionally in the East Coast Hockey League, Colonial Hockey League and the Central Hockey League, before retiring for good in 1994.

Coaching career
Mutch served as an assistant coach on the United States national women's ice hockey team, where he started his career as a women's hockey coach in 1996. During his time as assistant coach, the national team won gold at the 1998 Winter Olympics. 

Mutch also served as an assistant coach with men's hockey with the Omaha Lancers, the University of Nebraska-Omaha and his alma mater, Northeastern.

Boston College women's ice hockey
In four years as head coach of the women's ice hockey program at Boston College, Mutch revitalized a lagging program. 

During the 2006–2007 season, Mutch led the Boston College Eagles to their first ever NCAA Frozen Four appearance. Additionally, he led the Eagles to the first Beanpot Tournament Trophy in 2006, and repeated in 2007.

Mutch was named Hockey East Coach of the Year for his work with Boston College in 2005 and 2007.

Resignation and scandal
On April 24, 2007, Mutch resigned as head coach of the women's ice hockey program. The resignation came in the wake of an inappropriate relationship with Kelli Stack, a freshman who was the Hockey East Player and Rookie of the Year. The Boston Herald had printed an article earlier that day that detailed the alleged explicit text messaging that occurred between the married Tom Mutch and Stack.

Head coaching record

Personal life
Mutch is currently married to a former women's hockey player and is father to a daughter.

References

1967 births
Living people
People from Canton, Massachusetts
Northeastern Huskies men's ice hockey players
Memphis RiverKings players
Flint Bulldogs players
American ice hockey coaches
Northeastern University alumni
Boston College Eagles women's ice hockey coaches

External links